Ralph A. Jarvis (born June 1, 1965) is a former American football defensive end who played one season with the Indianapolis Colts of the National Football League. He was drafted by the Chicago Bears in the third round of the 1988 NFL Draft. He played college football at Temple University and attended Glen Mills Schools in Glen Mills, Pennsylvania. Jarvis was also a member of the Ottawa Rough Riders, Calgary Stampeders, Tampa Bay Storm, Massachusetts Marauders, Milwaukee Mustangs, Arizona Rattlers and New Jersey Red Dogs.

References

External links
Just Sports Stats

Living people
1965 births
Players of American football from Philadelphia
American football defensive ends
African-American players of American football
Temple Owls football players
Ottawa Rough Riders players
Calgary Stampeders players
Indianapolis Colts players
Tampa Bay Storm players
Massachusetts Marauders players
Milwaukee Mustangs (1994–2001) players
Arizona Rattlers players
New Jersey Red Dogs players
Players of Canadian football from Philadelphia
21st-century African-American people
20th-century African-American sportspeople